Elena Pavlovna Dahl (née Kornilova; born 10 February 1947 in Saint Petersburg, Russia; then Leningrad, USSR), is a Russian-Swedish author and translator. She is married to the Swedish linguist Östen Dahl.

She came to Sweden in 1968, where she studied literature, philosophy, and language at the University of Gothenburg. She worked as a teacher in Russia and as a freelance journalist for Radio Sweden before moving to Stockholm and working as a librarian and a translator, while also writing poetry. She published her first work, Three Russian Poets in Stockholm, in 1996. She has translated several works from Russian, including some writings by Boris Aranovich.

References 

1947 births
Living people
Writers from Stockholm
Russian women poets
Swedish women poets